Emiliano Té (born April 15, 1983 in Bissau) is a Bissau-Guinean football midfielder, who plays for GD Coruchense in the Portuguese lower divisions.

He played mostly in Portugal, but also played briefly for Chinese club Yanbian FC in 2008.

He holds Portuguese nationality.

External links

1983 births
Living people
Association football midfielders
Bissau-Guinean footballers
Sportspeople from Bissau
Guinea-Bissau international footballers
China League One players
F.C. Felgueiras players
Yanbian Funde F.C. players
C.D. Mafra players
Louletano D.C. players
U.D. Leiria players
Bissau-Guinean expatriate footballers
Bissau-Guinean expatriate sportspeople in Portugal
Expatriate footballers in Portugal
Bissau-Guinean expatriate sportspeople in China
Expatriate footballers in China